Klooster is both a Dutch and Estonian toponymic surname, both meaning "monastery, cloister".  Among the Dutch variant forms are ten Klooster, Van Clooster, van der Klooster, and van ('t) Klooster, each meaning "at/from (the) monastery". People with these surnames include:

Dirk van 't Klooster (born 1976), Dutch baseball player
 (1873–1940), Dutch graphic artist and painter, father of Philip
Kees-Jan van der Klooster (born 1977), Dutch Paralympic snowboarder
Milton Klooster (born 1996), Dutch football forward, twin brother of Rodney
Noël Van Clooster (born 1943), Belgian racing cyclist
 (1909–1969), Dutch sculptor and draughtsman, son of Johan
Rigard van Klooster (born 1989), Dutch track racing cyclist and speed skater
Rodney Klooster (born 1996), Dutch football defender, twin brother of Milton
Ton van Klooster (born 1954), Dutch freestyle swimmer
William Klooster (born 1957), Dutch ice hockey player

References

Dutch-language surnames
Estonian-language surnames
Toponymic surnames